Solanum umbelliferum is a species of nightshade known commonly as bluewitch nightshade,  or bluewitch. It can be found in chaparral habitat and low-elevation oak woodlands in California and parts of Baja California and Arizona. It is a small perennial herb or subshrub with dark gray-green oval-shaped leaves on hairy green stems that grow to a maximum height of one meter. It has bright purple or blue frilly flowers with thick yellow anthers at the center. The flowers close into spherical buds overnight. It bears small round green fruits which turn purple when ripe and resemble tiny eggplants.

It is a tough shrub which can grow in rocky and clay soils and springs up in areas recovering from wildfires or other disturbances. Like most other members of genus Solanum, S. umbelliferum contains toxic alkaloids.

References

External links

Jepson Manual Treatment
Photo gallery

umbelliferum
Flora of California
Flora of Arizona
Flora of Baja California
Flora of the Klamath Mountains
Natural history of the California chaparral and woodlands
Natural history of the California Coast Ranges
Natural history of the Central Valley (California)
Natural history of the Channel Islands of California
Natural history of the Peninsular Ranges
Natural history of the San Francisco Bay Area
Natural history of the Santa Monica Mountains
Natural history of the Transverse Ranges
Flora without expected TNC conservation status